Caterham School is an independent co-educational day and boarding school located in Caterham, Surrey and a member of the Headmasters' and Headmistresses' Conference.

History

Caterham School was founded as the Congregational School in 1811 in Lewisham, by John Townsend to provide a boarding education for the sons of Congregational Ministers. The abolitionist politician and philanthropist William Wilberforce was a governor of the school from its foundation until his death in 1833.

By 1884, the school had outgrown its premises, and the 114 boys along with their teaching staff moved to the present site in the North Downs in Surrey. In 1890, Caterham School opened its doors to the sons of laymen and to day boys. In 1995, after 184 years as a boys' day and boarding school, it merged with Eothen School for girls (founded by the Misses Pye in 1892) to become a co-educational school. Girls had been admitted to the sixth form education since 1981, but the merger integrated the schools and enabled co-education to be offered to pupils aged 3 years and upward. Upon merger, the school adopted the motto of Eothen School - prior to this merger, the motto was "Omnia Vinces Perseverando" ("Thou shalt overcome everything through perseverance").

Scholarships and bursaries
The school fees are comparable with other independent schools in the area. The school may award a scholarship if the applicant performs exceptionally well on the entrance exam tests. The scholarships can be for academics, art, design, innovation, music, sport, performing arts, or all-rounder. The academic scholarships are up to 50% off the school fees. The school also has a bursaries scheme for children of United Reformed Church ministers, for families in the armed forces or those on a low income.

Academics
Caterham School's GCSE academic results of 2019 saw 80% of pupils achieving an A*/A grade. The school's 2019 A-Level academic results saw 63.85% of pupils gaining an A*/A grade and 86% of pupils achieving an A*/B.

General information 
The  campus has facilities for extra curricular activity including 18 different sports, 20 music groups and over 36 clubs and societies. A new science block called the Davey Building was completed in 2006. It contains fifteen laboratories: five physics, five chemistry and five biology. In 2008 the North Wing was rebuilt to create a new sixth form centre and to provide a new location for the on-site health centre. The school has a Combined Cadet Force (CCF) and also participates in the Duke of Edinburgh Award scheme.

Caterham School is involved in sport. The school has coaches in the priority sports of rugby, hockey, and cricket for boys, and lacrosse and netball for girls. As well as being committed to supporting those with exceptional sporting talent, the school provides as many pupils as possible the chance to participate in sport.

The preparatory school has 280 pupils and the senior school (11 years to 18 years) has 870 pupils of which circa 165 board.

The current Headmaster is Ceri Jones, appointed in 2015.

The school has an exchange-based relationship with Western Reserve Academy, an American prep school.

Notable Old Caterhamians

James Benning (born 1983), cricketer
Ali Brown (born 1970), cricketer
Sir John Butterfill (born 1941), politician
Ann Conolly (1917-2010), botanist
Angus Deayton (born 1956), actor and television presenter
Cuthbert Dukes (1890–1977), pathologist and author
Sir Paul Dukes (1889–1967), journalist and MI6 officer
Jon Finch (1941–2012), film and television actor (1970–2005)
Jon Gilbert (born 1972), writer, bibliographer of Ian Fleming
Harry McInley (born 1993), cricketer
W. David McIntyre (born 1932), New Zealand historian and professor emeritus, University of Canterbury
Sir Alex Harley, Master Gunner, St. James's Park, 2001–2008
Philip Henman (1899–1986), chairman, General Lighterage Company, 1939–1969
Imogen Holst (1907-1984), composer, and daughter of Gustav Holst
Sir Arthur James (1916–1976), Judge of the Court of Appeal
Edward Jones, football manager who coached Egypt
Harold Marks (1914–2005), educator
Denis Mitchell (1911–1990), television and radio producer
John Morgan (1876–1955), barrister and professor of constitutional law, University College London, 1915–1941
Clement Price Thomas (1893–1973), pioneering surgeon
Pam Royds (1924-2016), publisher and children's book editor
David Sales (born 1977), cricketer
Eric Thiman (1900-1975), composer, conductor and organist
Claudia Williams (born 1933), artist

References

External links 
 

Educational institutions established in 1811
Private schools in Surrey
Member schools of the Headmasters' and Headmistresses' Conference
1811 establishments in England
United Learning schools
People educated at Caterham School